John Erik Kaada (born 28 July 1975), also known by the mononym Kaada, is a Norwegian singer-songwriter, producer, film score composer and multi-instrumentalist. Kaada's career spans a string of solo albums, motion picture soundtracks, high-profile collaborations with key players such as Mike Patton, as well as numerous live appearances at home and abroad.

Discography 

Kaada Recordings is a Norwegian label dedicated to releasing or licensing out the music of composer John Erik Kaada.

Solo albums 
 Thank You for Giving Me Your Valuable Time (2001 – re-released in 2003)
 MECD (2004)
 Music for Moviebikers (2006)
 Junkyard Nostalgias (2009)
 Kaada and the Late Bloomers in Concert (2012)
 Closing Statements (2018)

Kaada´s debut in a recorded format came with his 2001 solo album Thank You for Giving Me Your Valuable Time. A musical blend of woo-wop, show tunes and jungle rhythms into a coherent mix of live instrumentation and electronic elements, fusing elements of five decades of popular music. Thank You for Giving Me Your Valuable Time firmly established Kaada as a key voice on Norway´s blossoming music scene. The album was named as one of the ten most important releases of the year by Billboard.

2006 saw the release of Music for Moviebikers (Ipecac Recordings), a collection of lush arrangements set as soundtracks for imaginary films.  The album features an evocative quality as it sets out to bring the two musical worlds of Kaada together; the one of the recording artist with the cinematic film music one. The albums´s 22-strong ensemble consists of traditional instrumentation with strings, vocals and electric guitars as well as homemade instruments and some exotic folk music performers hailing from various corners of Europe. The strings were recorded in the Vigeland mausoleum in Oslo.

2009's outing Junkyard Nostalgias with its myriad sounds and instruments. The album was conceived as a self-proclaimed homage to the thousands of Polish workers that have come to Norway to earn a better living and to fuel the country´s economy with cheap labour. Junkyard Nostalgias featured Kaada playing all of the instruments on the album, solidifying his personal universe of sound.  Kaada have said about the album that he made it to justify buying hundreds of instruments on eBay

Kaada/Patton albums 
 Romances (2004)
 Bacteria Cult (2016)

A milestone in Kaada´s career came in 2004 with the release of the album Romances – a joint effort with Faith No More and Tomahawk vocalist Mike Patton An eerily addicting work with inspirations from classical music, Romances features the two composers working in tandem to create a slow-moving large piece based in late romanticism which again is made up of nine smaller pieces, resembling a symphony's compositional structure. In many ways, 'Romances' pays homage to Kaada's musical upbringing that included classical training from age six to 20 and a repertoire spanning form Franz Liszt, Johannes Brahms, Gustav Mahler, Debussy, Maurice Ravel and Béla Bartók.  The titles are lifted from old pieces from the Romantic period.

2007 saw the release of Kaada/Patton's Kaada/Patton Live DVD (Ipecac Recordings) – a live recording from the 2005 Roskilde Festival featuring a seven-piece ensemble playing mostly the repertoire of Romances . The outing features the full festival set as well as behind the scenes from the key event.

Kaada and Patton have maintained their musical bond over the last decade. Spring 2016 sees the release of their new joint effort ´Bacteria Cult´.

Cloroform albums 
 Deconstruction (Kaada Records, 1998)
 All-Scars (Kaada Records, 1998)
 Do the Crawl (Kaada Records, 2000)
 Scrawl (Kaada Records, 2001)
 Hey You Let's Kiss (Kaada Records, 2003)
 Cracked Wide Open (Kaada Records, 2005)
 Clean (Kaada Records, 2007)
 Grrr (Kaada Records, 2016)

Another key arena for Kaada´s compositional as well as improvisational output has been the exploratory trio Cloroform.  Highly active from 1998 to 2006, the trio released six critically acclaimed albums and toured extensively. Double bass, drums, keys and distorted vocals form the frame for Cloroform's highly-charged live sets and studio recordings. The trio made the transition from an underground act on the domestic scene to a live favourite on European stages, earning them a loyal following all over Europe.

DVD releases 
2007 – Kaada/Patton Live – Live performance DVD Kaada/Patton Live is a DVD of the collaboration between Mike Patton and John Kaada that was released on 20 November 2007.  The DVD features a live performance of the music from the album Romances from Roskilde Festival 2005. The entire concert is in black & white.
2008 – O' Horten DVD – interview together with director Bent Hamer
2012 – 'Kaada and the Late Bloomers in Concert – live DVD

Film music 
A core component of Kaada´s career has been composing film scores, beginning with 2000s low-budget domestic success Mongoland which generated considerable demand for his compositional skills.
2002 saw Kaada being bestowed with "the Golden Clapboard Prize" at the Amanda Award – the Norwegian equivalent to The Oscars at the time being the youngest film worker to receive the prestigious award. In the ensuing decade, Kaada went on to compose scores for some of the most successful domestic films as well as several international productions, earning him numerous awards for his distinct compositional style.

One of Kaada´s most notable international film score successes came in 2014 with the French blockbuster La liste de mes envies.  The motion picture, which featured a cast of major French actors, was box office hit in France and Belgium and resulted in a successful soundtrack released through Pathé.

Composing for films was something that I took up rather coincidentally, relates Kaada. – "I had not intended to pursue that direction and had no formal training, but at some point, writing film scores was what I did. In the beginning it was quite stressful and made me nervous, but now I'm enjoying the work much more, thinking of it as a compositional playground. Orchestration and sonorous experimentation are the fields that I really enjoy delving into these days. Working on film scores enables me to create unconventional instrument ensembles. I'm also doing music for documentaries and television scores in between film scores. TV gigs is a great composers' workshop, because you have the opportunity to experiment with small ensembles and develop composing and arranging skills." Kaada´s TV-music works has been heard on CNN, CBS, Fox and in relation to shows such as Late Night With Jimmy Fallon, Oprah, The Super Bowl, Jay Leno, The Daily Show With Jon Stewart, 60 Minutes and NBA Tonight.

Selected film scores

Soundtrack releases 
 Music from the motionpicture Natural Born Star (2007)
 Music from the motionpicture O'Horten (2008)
 La liste de mes envies (2014)
 Diving into the unknown (Original motion picture soundtrack) (2016)

See also 

 Mike Patton
 Ipecac Recordings
 Cloroform
 Kaada/Patton

References

External links 

Cloroform – Kaadas rockband
Kaada at Ipecac Recordings
Soundcloud.com/kaada

1975 births
Living people
Norwegian pop musicians
Musicians from Stavanger
Norwegian film score composers
Male film score composers
Norwegian multi-instrumentalists
Ipecac Recordings artists